The 2015–16 George Mason Patriots women's basketball team  represented George Mason University during the 2015–2016 College Basketball season. The Patriots, led by third year head coach Nyla Milleson. The George Mason Patriots are members of the Atlantic 10 Conference and play their home games at EagleBank Arena. They finished the season 12–19, 6–10 A-10 play to finish in ninth place. They advanced to the quarterfinals of the A-10 women's tournament where they lost to George Washington.

2015–2016 Media

George Mason Patriots Sports Network
Patriots games will be broadcast on WGMU Radio and streamed online through Patriot Vision . Most home games will also be featured on the A-10 Digital Network. Select games will be televised.

Roster

Schedule

|-
!colspan=9 style="background:#006633; color:#FFCC33;"| Exhibition

|-
!colspan=9 style="background:#006633; color:#FFCC33;"| Non-conference regular season

|-
!colspan=9 style="background:#006633; color:#FFCC33;"| Atlantic 10 regular season

|-
!colspan=9 style="background:#006633; color:#FFCC33;"| Atlantic 10 Women's Tournament

Rankings
2015–16 NCAA Division I women's basketball rankings

See also
 2015–16 George Mason Patriots men's basketball team

References

George Mason Patriots women's basketball seasons
George Mason
George Mason Patriots women's basketball